Omar Alejandro Salado Fuentes (born 15 February 1980) is a Mexican professional boxer who is the former WBA Fedelatin super flyweight champion.

Professional career

IBF Light Flyweight Championship
On August 4, 2006 Salado had a draw against IBF Light Flyweight Champion, Ulises Solís. He then went on to beat future World Champion, Gilberto Keb Baas.

WBA Light Flyweight Championship
In July 2011, Omar lost to WBA Light Flyweight Champion, Román González.

References

External links

Boxers from Guerrero
Sportspeople from Acapulco
Flyweight boxers
1980 births
Living people
Mexican male boxers